Macranthropy is the allegorical portrayal of the universe as a giant anthropomorphic body. The various components of the universe are assigned to corresponding body parts.

Macranthropy has made appearances in Ancient Egypt, Ancient Greece, Ancient Mesopotamia and Ancient India.

See also 
 Cipactli
 Macrocosm and microcosm
 Pangu
 Pantheism
 Purusha
 Ymir

References
 The Shape of Ancient Thought. Comparative studies in Greek and Indian Philosophies by Thomas McEvilley (Allworth Press and the School of Visual Arts, 2002) 

Allegory
Anthropomorphism